Stéphane Thierry Zobo (born 2 August 2000) is a Cameroonian professional footballer who plays as a forward for Championnat National 2 club Les Herbiers VF and the Cameroon U23 national team.

Club career 
Zobo made his professional debut for Toulouse in a 1–0 Coupe de France win over Niort on 20 January 2021. His Ligue 2 debut came on 24 July 2021, as he came on as a substitute in a 2–2 draw against Ajaccio. On 10 January 2022, his contract with Toulouse was terminated by mutual consent. He made a total of five appearances for the club.

On 11 January 2022, Zobo signed for Championnat National 2 side Béziers. He moved to fellow National 2 side Les Herbiers VF in the summer of 2022.

International career 
In the 2019 Africa U-23 Cup of Nations, Zobo made a total of two appearances for the Cameroon U23 national team.

Personal life
Zobo's brother Stève Mvoué is also a footballer. They were teammates at Toulouse.

Honours 
Toulouse

 Ligue 2: 2021–22

References

External links 
 
 
 

2000 births
Living people
Footballers from Yaoundé
Cameroonian footballers
Cameroon youth international footballers
Association football forwards
Toulouse FC players
AS Béziers (2007) players
Les Herbiers VF players
Ligue 2 players
Championnat National 2 players
Championnat National 3 players
Cameroonian expatriate footballers
Cameroonian expatriate sportspeople in France
Expatriate footballers in France